The Basilica of the Holy Redeemer, Tiruchirappalli is one of five Roman Catholic minor basilicas in the southern state of Tamil Nadu, India.

History
The origins of the basilica can be traced to the early decades of the 17th century, when Jesuit missionaries began spreading Christianity through the Madurai Mission. The first conversions occurred in the area known as Tiruchirappalli, also called "Trichy", in 1616. The missionaries eventually got support from the Hindu Naicker rulers of Madurai. The many Jesuit missionaries who worked in the Madurai Mission included Robert de Nobili and Constanzo Beschi.

While Trichy was still a mission station of the Madurai Mission, several Christian communities were established in Palakkarai, Dharmanathapuram, and Varaganeri. Even before the construction of the Holy Redeemer Church, there were some 7500 Christians in the area. They worshiped at the St. Mary's Cathedral, Trichy, rather than at Our Lady of Sorrows because the latter was under the administration of the Portuguese Padroado.

Realizing the need for the Christians of Palakkarai to have a church of their own, Bishop Alexis Canoz, S.J. laid the foundation for a new church on 9 February 1880. The church of the Most Holy Redeemer was consecrated on 29 June 1881 by the Vicar Apostolic of Pondicherry, Msgr. François-Jean-Marie Laouënan, M.E.P. 

The land for the construction of the church was a gift from the local ruler, Diwan Kanjamalai Medullar.

Devotion to Our Lady of Perpetual Help
In 1957 the novena devotion to Our Lady of Perpetual Help was introduced by the parish priest, Rev. A. Thomas, after a parish mission conducted by the Redemptorist priest Rev. Francis. The devotion has continued till the present as hundreds of devotees, Christian and non-Christian, gather to pray on Wednesdays.

Minor basilica
Pope Benedict XVI raised the church of the Most Holy Redeemer to the dignity of a minor basilica on 12 October 2006. The request for the elevation of the church to a basilica was presented to the Vatican by the Bishop of Trichy, Most Rev. Antony Devotee while Rev. A. Gabriel was the parish priest.

Art and architecture
The inner walls of this church are adorned with oil paintings of the saints and scenes from the Old and New Testaments.

Bishops of Tiruchirapalli Diocese 
Bishop Alexis Canoz, S.J.			1846–1888
Bishop John Barthe, S.J.			1888–1913
Bishop Ange-August Faisandier, S.J.		1913–1936
Bishop John Peter Leonard, S.J.		1936–1938
Bishop James Mendonça                          1938–1970
Bishop Thomas Fernando		    	        1971–1990
Bishop Lawrence Gabriel			1990–1997
Msgr. Vincent Mathias (administrator)	        1997–1999
Bishop Peter Fernando			        2000–2001
Bishop Anthony Devotta			        2001–2018
Bishop.Devadoss Ambrose (administrator)        2018-2021
Bishop Savarimuthu Arockia Raj		        2021–

See also

 Cathedral
 Duomo
 List of basilicas
 Roman architecture
 Tiruchirapalli

References

Holy Redeemer, Tiruchirappalli
Churches in Tiruchirappalli district
Roman Catholic churches in Tamil Nadu
Redemptorist churches
Churches in Tiruchirappalli